The International Shuffleboard Association - ISA - was founded in Saint Petersburg, Florida in 1979. Shuffleboard is a competitive game that is often played on ship decks or other large expanses of smooth outdoor surfaces and also at smaller scales on tables indoors. The ISA promotes Shuffleboard competition and travel worldwide. The 2009 Deck Shuffleboard championship in Zephyrhills, Florida at Betmar Shuffleboard Club featured 64 competitors.

References

Sports organizations established in 1979
Sports associations
Shuffleboard